Eumetula dilecta is a species of sea snail, a gastropod in the family Newtoniellidae, which is known from Antarctic waters.

It was described by Thiele, in 1912.

Description 
The maximum recorded shell length is 5 mm.

Habitat 
Minimum recorded depth is 94 m. Maximum recorded depth is 600 m.

References

Newtoniellidae
Gastropods described in 1912